= Product market regulation indicator =

Economic statistical indicator

The OECD Product Market Regulation (PMR) Indicators are a measure of regulatory barriers to firm entry and competition across a range of economic sectors and policy areas. These indicators were first published in 1998 and are usually updated every five years. The PMR indicators are commonly used in research as well as to identify priorities for policy reforms.

== Overview ==
PMR Indicators take the form of numerical scores ranging from 0 to 6, where 0 means that a country is close to regulatory international best practices and 6 that it is quite far. These scores are computed from the answers to a set of more than 1000 questions covering a range of economic sectors and policy areas, ranging from licensing and public procurement to governance of SOEs, price controls, evaluation of new and existing regulations, and foreign trade.

The purpose of the PMR indicators is to identify specific aspects of product market regulation that could hinder competition and create unnecessary barriers to the entry and the expansion of firms, thus being a drag on productivity and economic growth. In addition, the possibility to perform cross-country comparisons allows governments to draw on experiences from other countries in designing market regulations. The OECD has undertaken research that shows that pro-competitive regulation in the markets for goods and services can encourage firms to be more innovative and efficient, thereby increasing productivity and can help increase investment and employment. [15]

The questions and the structure underlying the PMR indicators are updated regularly to take account of new issues in regulation. [16] The most recent update to the PMR indicators was published in July 2024 and refers to the years 2023/2024. To provide a comparable reference point, the answers for 2018 have been reviewed using the same methodology. Older vintages of the PMR have been published using previous methodologies, meaning that the results are not necessarily comparable.
